Michele Marani (born 16 November 1982) is a retired football player from San Marino, who last played for S.S. Pennarossa.

References

Sammarinese footballers
San Marino international footballers
Living people
1982 births

Association football midfielders